Vinci Niel Clodumar (born 23 March 1951) is a Nauruan politician and former ambassador of the Republic of Nauru to the United Nations in New York.

Career 
He was Minister of Finance under Bernard Dowiyogo from September 1993 to June 1994.

In his address to the General Assembly at the 55th General Debate, Clodumar as the head of the Nauru Delegation criticised the Western European and Others Group, and advocated for the creation of a new Oceania regional group to include both Australia and New Zealand, as well as the ASEAN member countries, Japan, the Republic of Korea and the Pacific island countries. In his speech he mentioned that "the 11 Pacific island countries are drowning in the Asian Group, while Australia and New Zealand...are marooned in the Group of Western European and other States."

References 

1951 births
Living people
Members of the Parliament of Nauru
Permanent Representatives of Nauru to the United Nations
Finance Ministers of Nauru
Justice Ministers of Nauru
Labour Ministers of Nauru
Education ministers of Nauru
20th-century Nauruan politicians